Dalophia longicauda is an amphisbaenian species in the family Amphisbaenidae. The species is found in Namibia, Botswana, Zimbabwe, the Caprivi Strip, and Zambia.

References

Dalophia
Reptiles described in 1915
Taxa named by Franz Werner